The 2010–11 Dayton Gems season was the first season in the Central Hockey League of the CHL franchise in Dayton, Ohio.

Off-season
During the 2010-11 off-season it was announced that the Dayton Gems would move to the Central Hockey League along with the rest of the International Hockey League.

Regular season

Conference standings

Awards and records

Awards

Milestones

Transactions

Roster

 

|}

See also
 2010–11 CHL season

References

External links
 2010–11 Dayton Gems season at Pointstreak

D
D
Ice hockey in Dayton, Ohio